Anolis smaragdinus, also known commonly as the Bahamian green anole, is a species of lizard in the family Dactyloidae. The species is native to the Bahamas. There are two recognized subspecies.

Taxonomy
A. smaragdinus is part of the A. carolinensis series of anoles.

Geographic range
A. smaragdinus is endemic to the Bahamas.

Subspecies
Two subspecies are recognized as being valid, including the nominotypical subspecies:

Anolis smaragdinus lerneri 
Anolis smaragdinus smaragdinus

Etymology
The subspecific name, lerneri, is in honor of American businessman Michael Lerner, a patron of the American Museum of Natural History.

References

Further reading
Barbour T, Shreve B (1935). "Concerning some Bahamian reptiles, with notes on the fauna". Proceedings of the Boston Natural History Society 40: 347–365. (Anolis smaragdinus, new species, p. 355).
Schwartz A, Thomas R (1975). A Check-list of West Indian Amphibians and Reptiles. Carnegie Museum of Natural History Special Publication No. 1. Pittsburgh, Pennsylvania: Carnegie Museum of Natural History. 216 pp. (Anolis smaragdinus, pp. 104–105).

S
Lizards of the Caribbean
Endemic fauna of the Bahamas
Reptiles of the Bahamas
Reptiles described in 1935
Taxa named by Thomas Barbour
Taxa named by Benjamin Shreve